Meydenbauer Center  is a convention center in Bellevue, Washington.  It is located adjacent to Bellevue City Hall and Interstate 405.  The center opened in 1993.  It has a  exhibition hall, a  meeting room, a 410-seat performing arts theatre, and 434 parking spaces. In 2009 the center added a 2,500 sqft executive center that includes three meeting rooms. Meydenbauer Center hosts over 300 events each year including conventions, corporate meetings and events, and trade shows.

It is owned and operated by Bellevue Convention Center Authority (BCCA). The BCCA Board of Directors are appointed by the Bellevue City Manager and confirmed by the Bellevue City Council.

References

External links 

Buildings and structures in Bellevue, Washington
Convention centers in Washington (state)
Tourist attractions in King County, Washington